Canton Rugby Football Club is a rugby union team from the district of Canton, in Cardiff, South Wales.  The club plays their home games at Lawrenny Avenue, located off Leckwith Road, Cardiff.

Canton Rugby Football Club commenced playing in 1876 and was one of the three clubs that founded the Cardiff and District Rugby Union. During this time three teams played within the Canton boundary. Today only Canton remain, the teams of the 1880s provided Cardiff Rugby Club with a stream of players including Welsh Internationals, William James 'Billy' Jenkins, William James Wood 'Buller' Stadden, Albert John Hybart and Billy Douglas to name a few.

Club honours

Mallett Cup            1920
Lord Ninian Stuart Cup 1920

Notable former players 
 Buller Stadden
 Albert Hybart
 William Matthew Douglas
 Dai Lewis
 Dick Kedzlie
 Viv Huzzey
 James Hawkins
 Robert Francis Williams
 William James Jenkins
 Glen Webbe

Bibliography

References 

Welsh rugby union teams
Rugby clubs established in 1876
1876 establishments in Wales
Sport in Cardiff